Stuart Creek Station is a pastoral lease that once operated as a sheep station. It now operates as a cattle station in outback South Australia.

Description
The property is bounded to the north by Lake Eyre South, to the east by Billa Kalina Station, the south by Mulagaria and Andamooka Stations and to the east by Finniss Springs Aboriginal lands. The ephemeral watercourse, Stuart Creek, runs through the property.

The property is a mixture of land types including sandhills, breakaways, mound springs and gibber plains.

History
The first European to pass through the area was John McDouall Stuart in 1858 who named the Creek Chambers Creek. He was awarded a claim in the area and the creek was later renamed Stuart Creek. By 1862 Stuart was in ill-health and sold his claim to Alfred Barker and John Chambers. Barker stocked the property but significant stock losses during the drought of the late 1860s and early 1870s. he drought that struck from 1864 to 1865 was broken by floods in 1866. John Howard Angus acquired the property in 1870.

The feat was considered a droving record of the time. In 1911 the property was owned by the Willowie Pastoral Company and managed by Mr Paxton. About 23 bores had been sunk on the station. The company put the property up for auction of 1916 when it occupied an area of  but it was passed in and remained unsold.

By 1918 it was acquired by the Kidman family who retained possession for the next 80 years. The property was an outstation of Anna Creek Station until it was partitioned in 1998. A  northern portion was absorbed into the Anna Creek lease with the remaining larger lease acquired by Western Mining Corporation.

See also
List of ranches and stations
List of the largest stations in Australia

References

Stations (Australian agriculture)
Pastoral leases in South Australia
Far North (South Australia)